Ramsay George Najjar (26 July 1952  19 November 2020) was a Lebanese business executive, journalist, and writer. He was the founder of Saatchi & Saatchi Levant where he also served as a chief executive officer. He also founded Strategic Communication Consultancy (S2C) where he served as the managing partner

Education
Najjar received his Bachelor of Arts in Comparative Literature and Master of Arts in Mass Communication

Najjar was known for his contribution to the Lebanese Academy of Fine Arts. He was also known for his books such as Arab Philosophy Through History (published 1977), So That God Comes Back to Lebanon and The Right Not to Remain Silent.

He died from COVID-19 complications in Beirut on 19 November 2020, aged 68, during the COVID-19 pandemic in Lebanon. After his death, Elie Jabre, chief executive officer of DDB Lebanon tributed Ramzi for his contributions to the advertising industry in Lebanon.

References

1952 births
2020 deaths
American University of Beirut alumni
20th-century Lebanese writers
Lebanese journalists
Lebanese chief executives
Lebanese company founders
Deaths from the COVID-19 pandemic in Lebanon